FCM Câmpina  was a Romanian football team from Poiana Câmpina, Prahova County founded in 1936 and dissolved in 2008.

History

The team was founded under the name Astra Câmpina, which was a local factory that was sponsoring the team. Later the team changed its name to Poiana Câmpina.

Even though the team is now called FCM Câmpina (Municipal Football Club Câmpina), most of its fans still call the team "Poiana" or "Poieniţa", a diminutive. Furthermore, FCM Câmpina used to be, for a couple of years, Dinamo Bucharest's second team, and was back then called Dinamo Poiana Câmpina. During this affiliation, football lovers from Câmpina were able to see playing for the local team famous players who were on loan from Dinamo: Ianis Zicu, Ionel Danciulescu, Vlad Munteanu, Cristian Pulhac and others, players that have several selections in the national team.

The most important player to have been developed by FCM Câmpina is Daniel Costescu, who played for first division clubs like Petrolul Ploieşti, FC Argeş Piteşti or Ceahlăul Piatra Neamţ, scoring 44 goals in 222 matches in the first division, and 21 goals in 67 matches in the second division.

On August 5, 2008, chairman Chiţu announced that the team has been dissolved and he does not wish to play any further part in Câmpina's football, thus destroying a football club with 72 years of tradition.

Chronology of names

Honours 
Liga II:
Runners-up (2): 1955, 1961–62

Liga III:
Winners (6): 1946–47, 1977–78, 1985–86, 1987–88, 1993–94, 2004–05
Runners-up (6): 1973–74, 1974–75, 1981–82, 1986–87, 1991–92, 2002–03

Ploiești Regional Championship
Winners (1): 1951

Notable players
 Ianis Zicu
 Vlad Munteanu
 Cristian Pulhac
 Daniel Costescu
 Iulian Minea

Notable Managers
 Nicolae Babeti
 Ștefan Nanu

References

Liga II clubs
Association football clubs established in 1936
Association football clubs disestablished in 2008
Defunct football clubs in Romania
Football clubs in Prahova County
1936 establishments in Romania
2008 disestablishments in Romania
Câmpina